Louis Jenkins could refer to: 

Louis Jenkins (politician) (1869-1939)
Louis Jenkins (poet) (1942-2019), American prose poet
Woody Jenkins (Louis Elwood Jenkins Jr.) (born 1947), American journalist and politician

See also
Louise Freeland Jenkins (1888-1970), American astronomer